Mallophora is a genus of bee killers in the family Asilidae. There are about 60 described species in Mallophora.

Selected species
 Mallophora ardens Macquart, 1834
 Mallophora atra Macquart, 1834 (black bee killer)
 Mallophora bomboides (Wiedemann, 1821)
 Mallophora fautrix Osten Sacken, 1887
 Mallophora fulviventris Macquart, 1850
 Mallophora leschenaulti Macquart, 1838 (belzebul bee-eater)
 Mallophora orcina (Wiedemann, 1828) (southern bee killer)
 Mallophora thompsoni Artigas and Angulo, 1980
Mallophora ruficauda Wiedemann, 1828

References

Further reading

External links

 

Asilidae
Asilidae genera